Paulo Roberto Junges, commonly known as Gauchinho (born 7 May 1976) is a retired Brazilian football striker. His best performance as a striker came in 1999 while playing for Cerro Porteño, as he was the top scorer for the Copa Libertadores 1999 of the same year with 6 goals and the Paraguayan 1st Division topscorer with 22 goals.

Biography 
Gauchinho was born in Selbach on 7 May 1976.

Early life 

Gauchinho always had a passion for playing football. He spared no efforts to achieve this dream. "Since he was four years old, he didn't change the ball for anything" as his mother Ilária said. In 1991 at 15, the dream of becoming a football player started to materialize. He passed the test playing on the children-youth squad of Sport Club Internacional of Porto Alegre where he played for more than a year. In 1992 he moved to Tuna Luso in the city of Belém, capitol of Pará State, Colombia, where he played in the youth academy, and by the year 1995 he had aroused the interest of some of Brazil biggest clubs. He was loaned to São Paulo to participate in the Copa São Paulo de Juniores. The manager of the Junior team, Dario Pereyra, had already formed his team, so Gauchinho didn't get a chance to play, returned to his home club and signed his first professional contract.

Professional career 

Gauchinho began work as a professional at 20, when he was on the lineup of Junior, in the Brazilian championship of 1996 – Series B, defending Tuna Luso of Belém in 3 games and scoring 5 goals. In 1997, businessman Sergio Malucelli Luiz negotiated a contract, transferring him to Iraty Sport Club of Paraná. That year he played in the Regional Championship of the State of Paraná, and was the highlight of the team. This success earned him a transfer to Paraná – PR to play in the Brazilian championship of soccer 1997 – Series A. Playing at Paraná Club, he scored 12 goals, almost half of the 30 goals scored by the team that year in the Brazilian Series A Championship. In 1998 he transferred to the staff of XV November in Piracicaba in the State of São Paulo. There he played in the Brazilian championship of 1998 – Series B. He was the greatest striker of the competition with 16 goals. In 1999 Gauchinho achieved an old dream of his, by participating in an international championship, playing for Cerro Porteno of Paraguay,he achieved great success in Copa Libertadores 1999, and was one of the highlights of the competition and the highest scorer, with 6 goals. In 1999, in addition to his excellent participation in the Copa Libertadores 1999, he was also champion of the Clausura National Championship of Paraguay, and was the highest goalscorer of the tournament with 14 goals. That same year, he was also the highest goalscorer in the Apertura Tournament with 12 goals. That year he also played in the Copa Mercosur scoring 1 goal.

In 2000 he made the biggest jump in his career, moving to Gremio – RS, however he competed with Ronaldinho Gaúcho for a spot in the attack, and not receiving any great chances he wound up leaving. In 2001 he passed through four major Brazilian football clubs. Starting at Atletico – PR, after few games he went to play in the Regional Championship of São Paulo State for Botafogo – SP, where he scored important and decisive goals that led the team to the finals, where they succumbed to Corinthians. Next, he was transferred to Goiás – GO to play in the Brazilian championship of Soccer of 2001 – Series A. After the first round, he was transferred to Avaí – SC, where he made several great performances, scoring 12 goals and succeedinh in the qualifying stage to lead his team to fight in the semi-final. In 2002, he played for Internacional – SP and America – RN. In 2003 he ventured back into international football playing at Cruz Azul in Mexico, yet after a good start, suffered a fractured cheekbone in a scrum, and required a surgery that kept him out of action for months. In 2004, already recovered, he returned to Paraguay to the play in the national championship, this time playing for Guaraní. In 2005, he returned to Brazil to play for Union Barbarense – SP, playing in the Brazilian championship of 2005 – Series B. In 2006 he played in the Colombian national championship for Deportes Tolima. In 2007-2008 he returned to Brazil to play at Luverdense of Lucas do Rio Verde, located in the north of the State of Mato Grosso and within only two years became the greatest striker of the club's history with 44 goals in only 54 games, of which 9 goals were scored in the Brazilian championship of 2008 – Series C.

In 2009 he participated in the Regional Football Championship of the State of Mato Grosso, defending the colors of Sinop – MT, and was the highlight and highest goalscorer of the team, participating in only 8 games and was the third highest goalscorer of the competition with 6 (two less than the maximum scorer). He played in 6 games of the Brazilian championship of 2009 – Series D, scoring 3 goals for Treze, however the team didn't get the points needed to pass to the next stage, finishing third place in the group, and was eliminated.

Artillery 
Artilleryman of the Championship Paraense de Futebol juniores in the year of 1995 with 14 goals for Tuna Luso.

Artilleryman of the Brazilian Championship of soccer 1998 Series – B with 16 goals for XV Nov. Piracicaba – SP.

Artilleryman of the Match Apertura – national championship of the Paraguay of 1999 with 14 goals for Cerro Porteno.

Artilleryman of the Match Clausura – national championship of the Paraguay of 1999 with 16 goals for Cerro Porteno.

Artilleryman of Copa Libertadores with 6 goals for Cerro Porteno – of Paraguay

References

References

External links
Estatísticas no Futpédia

Maior artilheiro do Luverdense – MT
Site Oficial do Luverdense Esporte Clube – MT
Paulo Roberto Junges at BDFA.com.ar 
Profile at the Brazilian FA database 

1976 births
Living people
People from Rio Grande do Sul
Brazilian footballers
Brazilian expatriate footballers
Expatriate footballers in Paraguay
Expatriate footballers in Mexico
Expatriate footballers in Colombia
Brazilian expatriate sportspeople in Colombia
Brazilian expatriate sportspeople in Paraguay
Brazilian football managers
Sport Club Internacional players
Tuna Luso Brasileira players
São Paulo FC players
Paraná Clube players
Iraty Sport Club players
Esporte Clube XV de Novembro (Piracicaba) players
Cerro Porteño players
Grêmio Foot-Ball Porto Alegrense players
Club Athletico Paranaense players
Botafogo Futebol Clube (SP) players
Goiás Esporte Clube players
Avaí FC players
Associação Atlética Internacional (Limeira) players
América Futebol Clube (RN) players
Cruz Azul footballers
Club Guaraní players
União Agrícola Barbarense Futebol Clube players
Deportes Tolima footballers
Luverdense Esporte Clube players
Treze Futebol Clube players
Sinop Futebol Clube players
Esporte Clube Internacional players
Brasília Futebol Clube players
Campeonato Brasileiro Série B players
Brasília Futebol Clube managers
Campeonato Brasileiro Série D managers
Association football forwards
Sportspeople from Rio Grande do Sul